Imaclava pilsbryi is a species of sea snail, a marine gastropod mollusk in the family Drilliidae.

Description
The size of an adult shell varies between 20 mm and 30mm.

Distribution
This species occurs in the demersal zone of the Pacific Ocean from Sonora, Mexico to El Salvador.

References

  Tucker, J.K. 2004 Catalog of recent and fossil turrids (Mollusca: Gastropoda). Zootaxa 682:1–1295

External links
 

pilsbryi
Gastropods described in 1950